Yashoda Nilamber Verma is an Indian politician who is serving as Member of Chhattisgarh Legislative Assembly from Khairagarh Assembly constituency. Yashoda is the member of Indian National Congress.

Political career
Yashoda fought 2022 by-poll as Congress candidate and won the by-poll which were necessitated after the death of Devwrat Singh. Out of total votes cast, there were 1,65,407 votes; BJP candidate Komal Janghel got 67524; Congress candidate Yashoda Verma got 87,690; JCCJ candidate Narendra Soni got 1,218 votes; and 2,480 people pressed NOTA.

Personal life 
Born in 1986, Yashoda hails from Devaribhat village in Khairagarh tehsil of Khairagarh-Chhuikhadan-Gandai district.

References 

1986 births
Living people